Petar Zovko (born 25 March 2002) is a Bosnia and Herzegovina professional footballer who plays as a goalkeeper for Italian  club Spezia.

Career
Zovko started his career with Italian Serie A side Spezia. On 22 May 2022, he debuted for Spezia during a 3–0 loss to Napoli.

References

External links
 

2002 births
Living people
Bosnia and Herzegovina footballers
Association football goalkeepers
Bosnia and Herzegovina youth international footballers
Serie A players
Spezia Calcio players
Bosnia and Herzegovina expatriate footballers
Bosnia and Herzegovina expatriate sportspeople in Italy
Expatriate footballers in Italy